Ronald Herbert Ellis (19 September 1915 – 2 July 2008) was an Australian rules footballer who played with St Kilda in the Victorian Football League (VFL).

Notes

External links 

1915 births
2008 deaths
Australian rules footballers from Melbourne
St Kilda Football Club players
Brighton Football Club players
People from Carlton North, Victoria